Samuel Howard Whitbread   (8 January 1858 – 29 July 1944) was a British Member of Parliament and a member of the Whitbread brewing family.

Career
He was the son of Samuel Whitbread. He served as the Member of Parliament for the constituencies of Huntingdon and Luton (until 1895).

He was appointed a deputy lieutenant of Bedfordshire on 31 March 1906. In 1912, he became Lord Lieutenant of Bedfordshire (until 1936).

Whitbread was appointed a Companion of the Order of the Bath in the 1917 Birthday Honours.

Family
On 16 January 1904, he married Madeline Bourke, the granddaughter of the 5th Earl of Mayo. They had three children together. 
 Major Simon Whitbread (born 12 October 1904, died 1985)
 Anne Joscelyne Whitbread (born 9 November 1906, died 1936)
 Humphrey Whitbread (born 7 February 1912, died 4 July 2000)

References

External links
 

1858 births
1944 deaths
Deputy Lieutenants of Bedfordshire
Liberal Party (UK) MPs for English constituencies
Lord-Lieutenants of Bedfordshire
UK MPs 1892–1895
UK MPs 1906–1910
Companions of the Order of the Bath